Al Rais Cargo was a cargo airline based in Dubai, United Arab Emirates. It was established in 1983 and its main base was Dubai International Airport.

History

Al Rais Cargo launched it's airline division in 2004 with an investment of $9 million dollars with a fleet of two Boeing 727-200F's. Its first flight commenced on 1 December 2004 to Tehran, Iran with 20 tonnes of cargo.

The airline ceased operations in 2008.

Fleet

Al Rais Cargo operated the following aircraft (at March 2007):

External links
Al Rais Cargo

References

Defunct airlines of the United Arab Emirates
Defunct cargo airlines
Airlines established in 1983
Cargo airlines of the United Arab Emirates
Emirati companies established in 1983